A  (
 or ) was a poet as represented in Old English poetry. The scop is the Old English counterpart of the Old Norse , with the important difference that "skald" was applied to historical persons, and scop is used, for the most part, to designate oral poets within Old English literature. Very little is known about scops, and their historical existence is questioned by some scholars.

Functions 

The scop, like the similar gleeman, was a reciter of poetry. The scop, however, was typically attached to a court on a relatively permanent basis. There, he most likely received rich gifts for his performances. The performances often featured the recitation of recognisable texts such as the "old pagan legends of the Germanic tribes." However, the scop's duties also included composing his own poetry in different situations, the eulogizing of his master. While some scops moved from court to court, they were (generally speaking) less nomadic than the gleemen and had positions of greater security.

Etymology 

Scop, and relationship to scold
While  became English scoff, the Old Norse  lives on in a Modern English word of a similarly deprecating meaning, scold. There is a homonymous Old High German  meaning "abuse, derision" (Old Norse , meaning "mocking, scolding", whence scoff), a third meaning "tuft of hair", and yet another meaning "barn" (cognate to English shop). They may all derive from a Proto-Germanic .

The association with jesting or mocking was, however, strong in Old High German. , on the other hand, is of a higher register, glossing . The question cannot be decided formally since the Proto-Germanic forms coincided in zero grade, and by the time of the surviving sources (from the late 8th century), the association with both roots may have influenced the word for several centuries.

Literary fiction or reality

The scholar of literature Seth Lerer suggests that "What we have come to think of as the inherently 'oral' quality of Old English Poetry... [may] be a literary fiction of its own." Scholars of Early English have different opinions on whether the Anglo-Saxon oral poet ever really existed. Much of the poetry that survives does have an oral quality to it, but some scholars argue that it is a trait carried over from an earlier Germanic period. If, as some critics believe, the idea of the Anglo-Saxon oral poet is based on the Old Norse Skald, it can be seen as a link to the heroic past of the Germanic peoples. There is no proof that the "scop" existed, and it could be a literary device allowing poetry to give an impression of orality and performance. This poet figure recurs throughout the literature of the period, whether real or not. Examples are the poems Widsith and Deor, in the Exeter Book, which draw on the idea of the mead-hall poet of the heroic age and, along with the anonymous heroic poem Beowulf express some of the strongest poetic connections to oral culture in the literature of the period.

The scholar and translator of Old English poetry Michael Alexander, introducing his 1966 book of The Earliest English Poems, treats the scop as a reality within an oral tradition. He writes that since all the material is traditional, the oral poet achieves mastery of alliterative verse when the use of descriptive half-line formulae has become "instinctive"; at that point he can compose "with and through the form rather than simply in it". At that point, in Alexander's view, the scop "becomes invisible, and metre becomes rhythm".

The nature of the scop in Beowulf is addressed by another scholar-translator, Hugh Magennis, in his book Translating Beowulf. He discusses the poem's lines 867–874, which describe, in his prose gloss, "a man... mindful of songs, who remembered a multitude of stories from the whole range of ancient traditions, found new words, properly bound together". He notes that this offers "an image of the poetic tradition in which Beowulf participates", an oral culture: but that "in fact this narrator and this audience are [in this instance] a fiction", because when the Beowulf text is read out, the narrator is absent. So, while the poem feels like a scop's "oral utterance .. using the traditional medium of heroic poetry", it is actually "a literate work, which offers a meditation on its [centuries old] heroic world rather than itself coming directly from such a world".

Further reading 
 Frank, Roberta. "The Search for the Anglo-Saxon Oral Poet". Bulletin of the John Rylands University of Manchester, 1993. 75:11-36.
 Niles, John D. "The Myth of the Anglo-Saxon Poet." Western Folklore 62.1/2(2003): 7-61.
 O'Brien O'Keeffe, Katherine. Visible Song: Transitional Literacy in Old English Verse. Cambridge: Cambridge University Press, 1990. 
 Pasternack, Carol Braun.  The Textuality of Old English Poetry. Cambridge: Cambridge University Press, 1995.
 Bahn, Eugene, and Margaret L. Bahn. "Medieval Period." A History of Oral Interpretation. Minneapolis: Burgess Pub., 1970. 49-83.

See also

 Grendel novel
 Sumbel
 Bard
 Bragi

References

Anglo-Saxon paganism
Anglo-Saxon society
Old English poetry
 
Poets
Entertainment occupations
Medieval occupations